The musical compositions of Gustav Mahler (1860–1911) are almost exclusively in the genres of song and symphony. In his juvenile years he attempted to write opera and instrumental works; all that survives musically from those times is a single movement from a piano quartet from around 1876–78. From 1880 onwards Mahler was a professional conductor whose composing activities had to be fitted around concert and theatrical engagements. Nevertheless, over the next 30 years he produced nine complete symphonies and sketches for a tenth, several orchestral song cycles and many other songs with piano or orchestral accompaniment.  Mahler's symphonies are generally on an expansive scale, requiring large forces in performance, and are among the longest in the concert repertoire.

Mahler scholar Deryck Cooke divides Mahler's compositions into separate creative phases, preceded by a  "juvenile" period up to 1880. The earliest surviving whole work is Das klagende Lied (The Song of Lament), a cantata for soloists, chorus and orchestra which was completed in 1880 just before Mahler took up his first conducting post. In Cooke's chronology Mahler's first period as a mature composer extends over 20 years, to 1900, and includes his first four symphonies, his first song cycle Lieder eines fahrenden Gesellen ("Songs of a Wayfarer") and numerous other songs. The period includes Mahler's Wunderhorn phase, after his discovery in 1887 of the German folk-poems collected by Achim von Arnim and Clemens Brentano under the title Des Knaben Wunderhorn ("The Young Lad's Magic Horn"). Music critic Neville Cardus writes that this anthology nourished the composer's "pantheistic feelings about life and the world ... in which an all-embracing love [makes] all creatures kin." Mahler set 24 of these poems to music; three were absorbed into his Second, Third and Fourth symphonies; nine were used to create Volumes II and III of Lieder und Gesänge ("Songs and Airs"), and the remaining 12 were grouped to form Mahler's own Wunderhorn song cycle.

Cooke dates Mahler's "middle period" as between 1901 and 1907, covering the trio of instrumental symphonies (Fifth, Sixth and Seventh), the massive Eighth Symphony, and the settings of poems by Friedrich Rückert including the Kindertotenlieder cycle and the Rückert-Lieder. The final period covers the last works: the symphonic Das Lied von der Erde ("The Song of the Earth") and the Ninth and Tenth Symphonies. None of these late works were performed during Mahler's lifetime. The unfinished Tenth Symphony was rendered by Deryck Cooke into a "performing version" which was first performed in London in 1964.

Summary of surviving works

Early works
1876: Piano Quartet in A minor
1878–80: Das klagende Lied
1880: Three Lieder: "Im Lenz"; "Winterlied"; "Maitanz im Grünen"
1880–83: Lieder und Gesänge Vol. I (five songs)
1885–86: Lieder eines fahrenden Gesellen (four songs)
1884: Der Trompeter von Säckingen (lost, except for movement Blumine that was included in early versions of Symphony No. 1, see below)

Wunderhorn period
1887–88: Die Drei Pintos adaptation
1887–90: Lieder und Gesänge Vol. II (four songs)
1887–90: Lieder und Gesänge Vol. III (five songs)
1888–96: Symphony No. 1 in D
1888–94: Symphony No. 2
1892: "Das himmlische Leben" (Wunderhorn setting later used in Symphony No. 4)
1892–1901: Des Knaben Wunderhorn (12 songs)
1894–96: Symphony No. 3
1899–1901: Symphony No. 4

Middle period
1901–04: Rückert-Lieder (5 songs)
1901–04: Kindertotenlieder (5 songs)
1901–02: Symphony No. 5
1903–04: Symphony No. 6 in A minor
1904–05: Symphony No. 7
1906–07: Symphony No. 8 in E-flat

Late works
1908–09: Das Lied von der Erde
1909–10: Symphony No. 9
1910: Symphony No. 10 in F sharp (unfinished; continuous draft score)

List of works

Dresden archive
The possibility of previously unknown early Mahler works emerged when, in 1938, the Dutch conductor Willem Mengelberg revealed the existence of an archive of manuscripts in Dresden, in the hands of Marion von Weber, with whom Mahler had been romantically involved in the 1880s. Mengelberg claimed that these manuscripts included drafts of four early symphonies, which he and the German composer Max von Schillings had played through on the piano. Mahler historian Donald Mitchell writes: "Though one may perhaps be a shade sceptical about the existence of four symphonies, each of them completely carried through, the strong possibility remains that some important manuscripts, either early symphonies or parts of early symphonies, were to be found in Dresden." The archive was almost certainly destroyed in the bombing of Dresden in February 1945.

Arrangements and editions
In his capacity as a conductor Mahler was responsible for many rescorings of works by, among others, J.S. Bach, Beethoven and Schumann. He also prepared string orchestra versions of Beethoven's String Quartet No. 11 and Schubert's Death and the Maiden Quartet, and a four-hand piano arrangement of Bruckner's Third Symphony.

Notable recordings
Many artists recorded works of Mahler. Some boxes are available with all symphonies:
Leonard Bernstein recorded all symphonies with New York Philharmonic during the 60's; then recorded a new cycle of symphonies from 70's with 3 different orchestras
Riccardo Chailly recorded all symphonies with Royal Concertgebouw Orchestra
Bernard Haitink recorded all symphonies with Royal Concertgebouw Orchestra
Valery Gergiev recorded all symphonies with London Symphony Orchestra
Rafael Kubelík recorded all symphonies with Bavarian Radio Symphony Orchestra
Lorin Maazel recorded all symphonies with Philharmonia Orchestra
Klaus Tennstedt recorded all symphonies with London Philharmonic Orchestra
Georg Solti recorded all symphonies with Chicago Symphony Orchestra

References

Sources

 Martner, Knud, Mahler's Concerts, Kaplan Foundation, New York 2010

Mahler